Rage Against the Machine is an American rock band.

Rage Against the Machine may also refer to the following works by the band:

 Rage Against the Machine (album), their self-titled debut album
 Rage Against the Machine (demo album) (also known as American Composite), their original demo tape
 Rage Against the Machine (video), a music video featuring live performances and video clips